Ecclesfield West railway station was a railway station in Sheffield, South Yorkshire, England. The station served the communities of Ecclesfield and Shiregreen and was situated on the Midland Railway, lying between Chapeltown and Brightside.

The station was opened in 1897 along with the line from Wincobank Junctions to  Cudworth.  It was initially known as Ecclesfield, but was renamed in 1950 to avoid confusion with the Ecclesfield East railway station. It closed in 1967, although it was later used for excursions until 1968.

References

External links
South Yorkshire Railway
 Ecclesfield West station (shown open) on navigable 1955 O. S. map

Ecclesfield
Disused railway stations in Sheffield
Railway stations in Great Britain opened in 1897
Railway stations in Great Britain closed in 1967
Former Midland Railway stations